The Essex Community School District based in Essex, Iowa, United States, is a rural public school district serving the town of Essex and surrounding areas in northwestern Page County, with a small area in southern Montgomery County.

The school's mascot is the Trojans. Their colors are red and black.

Schools
The district operates two schools on one campus in Essex:
Essex Elementary School
Essex Junior-Senior High School

Essex Junior-Senior High School

Athletics
The Trojans compete in the Corner Conference in the following sports:

Cross Country (boys and girls)
Volleyball 
Football 
Basketball (boys and girls)
Wrestling
Track and Field (boys and girls)
Baseball 
Softball

Enrollment

See also
List of school districts in Iowa
List of high schools in Iowa

References

External links
 Essex Community School District

Education in Page County, Iowa
Education in Montgomery County, Iowa
School districts in Iowa